Olaf Hegnander (28 October 1897 – 24 February 1958) was a Norwegian footballer. He played in one match for the Norway national football team in 1918.

References

External links
 

1897 births
1958 deaths
Norwegian footballers
Norway international footballers
Place of birth missing
Association footballers not categorized by position